Uche Great Sabastine (born 10 June 2000) is a Nigerian football striker who plays for Östersund, on loan from Kano Pillars.

References

2000 births
Living people
Nigerian footballers
Kano Pillars F.C. players
Stabæk Fotball players
Eliteserien players
Östersunds FK players
Superettan players
Nigerian expatriate footballers
Expatriate footballers in Norway
Nigerian expatriate sportspeople in Norway
Expatriate footballers in Sweden
Nigerian expatriate sportspeople in Sweden
Association football forwards